Frank  is a masculine given name.

While Frank has been a European name in its own right, the given name in the English-speaking United States arose in the 20th century as a short form of the traditional common English variant Francis (which itself is a shortening of Franciscus, i.e. "the Frenchman", in reference to Saint Francis of Assisi). It was popularized particularly by Frank Sinatra (born Francis Albert Sinatra, 1915–1998).

The continental variant of Frank dates back to the Carolingian period in France and Germany (the early medieval Frankish Empire where originally Old Frankish was spoken by the elite). The Old High German form Francho, Franko is on record from the 8th century. Hence also the English adjective frank (Middle English, from Old French franc, 12th century).

People with the given name

In arts 

Also see Frank in fictional characters

 Frank Frazetta (1928–2010), American fantasy and science fiction artist
 Frank Lynn Jenkins (1870–1927), British sculptor
 Frank Marshall (photographer) (born 1985), South African photographer
 Frank Miles (1852–1891), British artist
 Frank O'Hara (1926-1966), American writer, poet, and art critic
 Frank Stella (born 1936), American painter and printmaker
 Frank Thomas (animator) (1912–2004), one of Walt Disney's team of animators known as the Nine Old Men

In architecture 

 Frank Furness (1839-1912), American architect
 Frank Gehry (born 1929)
 Frank Lloyd Wright (1867–1959)

In comics 

 Frank Bellamy  (1917–1976), British comics artist
 Frank Brunner (born 1949), American comics artist
 Frank Cirocco (born 1956), American comics artist
 Frank Giacoia (1924–1988), American comics artist
 Frank Le Gall (born 1959), French comics author
 Frank Madsen (born 1962), Danish comics artist
 Frank Margerin (born 1952), French comics author
 Frank Miller (born 1957), American comics author
 Frank Pé (born 1956), Belgian comics author
 Frank Springer (1929–2009), American comics artist
 Frank Thomas (comics) (1914–1968), American cartoonist; creator of The Eye
 Frank Tieri, American comics writer

In film and television 

 Frank Borzage (1894–1962), American film director and actor
 Frank Caliendo (born 1974), American comedy actor, impressionist and comedian, host of the television show Frank TV
 Frank Capra (1897–1991), American film director
 Frank Delfino (1911-1997), American actor
 Frank Elstner (born 1942), German television presenter
 Franky G (born 1965), American film and television actor
 Frank Gorshin (1933–2005), American actor and comedian from Pittsburgh, Pennsylvania
 Frank Marshall (producer) (born 1946) American film producer
 Frank Morgan (1890-1949), American character actor
 Frank Muller (1951–2008), Dutch audio book narrator and actor
 Frank Oz (born 1944), American actor and puppeteer
 Frank Skinner (born 1957), British comedian
 Frank Somerville (born 1958), American news anchor
 Frank M. Thomas (1889–1989), American actor
 Frank Twomey, the man from Irish children's television programme Bosco
 Frank Vincent (1937-2017), American actor
 Frank Welker (born 1946), American voice actor
 Frank Whaley (born 1963), American actor

In literature 

 Frank Chin (born 1940), Chinese-American author
 Frank Conniff (born 1958), American actor and writer who portrayed TV's Frank
 Frank Harris (1885-1931), Irish American journalist and autobiographer
 Frank Herbert (1920–1986), science fiction writer, author of the Dune series
 Frank Lebby Stanton (1857–1927), American lyricist
 Frank McCourt (1930–2009), Irish-American writer

In music 
 Frank Beard (musician) (born 1949), drummer for ZZ Top
 Frank Bello (born 1965), American bassist of thrash metal band Anthrax
 Frank Michael Beyer (1928-2008), German composer
 Frank Black (born 1965), American musician
 Frank Bridge (1879–1941), English composer
 Frank Corcoran (born 1944), Irish composer
 Frank Farian (born 1941), German songwriter and producer
 Frank Ferko (born 1950), American composer
 Frank Gambale (born 1958), Australian jazz fusion guitarist
 Frank Iero (born 1981), rhythm guitarist for the band My Chemical Romance and lead singer for the band Leathermouth
 Frank Klepacki (born 1974), American video game music composer
 Frank La Rocca (born 1951), American composer
 Frank Lewin (1925–2008), American composer
 Frank Loesser (1910–1969), American songwriter
 Frank Marino (born 1954), Canadian guitarist and hard rock band leader
 Frank Marshall (pianist) (1883–1959), Spanish pianist and pedagogue
 Frank Martin (1890–1974), Swiss composer
 Frank Ocean (born 1987), American musician
 Frank Proto (born 1941), American composer and bassist
 Frank Ricotti (born 1949), English jazz vibraphonist and percussionist
 Frank Sinatra (1915–1998), American singer and actor
 Frank Slay (1930–2017), American songwriter, record producer
 Frank Ticheli (born 1958), American composer
 Frank Turner (born 1981), British folk/punk singer songwriter
 Frank Edwin Wright III (known as Tre Cool, born 1972), drummer of the band Green Day
 Frank Zander (born 1942), German singer and actor
 Frank Zappa (1940–1993), American musician and composer

In radio 

 Frank Sontag (born 1955), talk radio host

In sports
 Frank Abercrombie (1850–1939), American baseball player
 Frank Abruzzino (1908–1986), American football player
 Frank Albrechtsen New Zealand association football player
 Frank Bahret (1858-1888), American baseball player
 Frank Bartley (born 1994), American basketball player for Ironi Ness Ziona of the Israeli Basketball Premier League
 Frank Beltre (born 1990), American football player
 Frank Broers (born 1977), Dutch football player
 Frank Bruno (born 1961), British WBC heavyweight boxing champion
 Frank Buttery (1851–1902), American baseball player
 Frank Bykowski (1915–1985), American football player
 Frank Darby (born 1997), American football player
 Frank Dehne (born 1976), German volleyball player
 Frank Dueckerhoff (born 1962), German ice hockey defenceman
 Frank Fleet (1848–1900), American baseball player
 Frank Gifford (1930–2015), American football player
 Frank Ginda (born 1997), American football player
 Frank Giorgi (born 1981), Australian kickboxer
 Frank Greenleaf (1877–1953), Canadian sports administrator
 Frank Hassell (born 1988), American basketball player
 Frank Henry (cricketer) (dates unknown), English cricketer
 Frank Herron (born 1994), American football player
 Frank Hood (1908–1955), American football player
 Frank Jacobsson (1930–2017), Swedish football player
 Frank Kooiman (born 1970), Dutch football player
 Frank Lampard (born 1978), English football player
 Frank Leatherwood (born 1977), American football player
 Frank Simmons Leavitt (1891–1953), professional wrestler, stuntman, and actor, known by his ring name Man Mountain Dean
 Frank Liivak (born 1996), Estonian football player
 Frank Mahoney (1901–1961), American football player
 Frank Manumaleuga (1956–2022), American football player
 Frank Marshall (footballer, born 1904) (1904–1928), Scottish association football player
 Frank Marshall (footballer, born 1929), English association football player and coach
 Frank Marshall (umpire) (1858–????), American professional baseball umpire
 Frank Marshall (rugby referee), 19th century
 Frank Matteo (1896-1983), American football player
 Frank McConnell (1887–1933), Canadian athlete
 Frank McPhee (American football) (1931–2011), American football player
 Frank Mill (born 1958), German football player
 Frank Minini (1921–2005), American football player
 Frank Mir (born 1979), American mixed martial artist
 Frank Moreno (born 1965), Cuban judoka
 Frank Müller (born 1968), German decathlete
 Frank Mundy (1918–2009), former NASCAR Cup Series driver
 Frank Nasworthy, American surfing and skateboarding enthusiast, introduced the urethane skateboard wheel and founded Cadillac Wheels Company
 Frank Patrick (running back) (1915–1992), American football player
 Frank Patrick (quarterback) (born 1947), American football player
 Frank Patrick (ice hockey) (1885–1960), Canadian ice hockey player
 Frank-Paul Nu'uausala (born 1987), New Zealand Rugby League player
 Frank Ragnow (born 1996), American football player
 Frank Reich (born 1961), American football player and coach
 Frank Rijkaard (born 1962), Dutch football player and manager
 Frank Robinson (1935–2019), Hall of Fame North American baseball player and manager
 Frank Pritchard (born 1983), Australian-New Zealand Rugby League player
 Frank Sandercock (1887–1942), a Canadian ice hockey administrator
 Frank Sargent (sports executive) (1902–1988), a Canadian sports executive in ice hockey and curling
 Frank Sinclair (born 1971), English-born Jamaican football player
 Frank Spellacy (1901–1960), American football player
 Frank Spellman (1922–2017), Olympic champion weightlifter
 Frank Thomas (American football) (1898–1954)
 Frank Thomas (designated hitter) (born 1968), Major League Baseball player in the American League from 1990 to 2008
 Frank Thomas (outfielder), (1929–2023) Major League Baseball player in the National League from 1951 to 1966
 Frank Trigilio (1919–1992), American football player
 Frank van Hattum (born 1958), New Zealand association football player
 Frank Vogel (born 1973), American basketball coach
 Frank Williams (Formula One) (1942–2021), British racing car driver and founder of the Williams Formula One team

Other
 Frank Abagnale (born 1948), former confidence trickster, check forger, skilled impostor and escape artist
 Frank Adams (1930–1989), British mathematician
 Frank Bainimarama (born 1954), Commander of the Fijian Military Forces and Interim Prime Minister
 Frank Barnett (1933–2016), 49th Governor of American Samoa
 Frank Baude (1936–2021), Swedish politician
 Frank Borman (born 1928), former NASA astronaut (Gemini 7, Apollo 8)
 Frank Bossard (1912–2001), Secret Intelligence Service agent convicted of spying for the USSR
 Frank Buchman (1878-1961), American evangelist
 Frank Buckles (1901–2011), United States Army corporal and the last surviving American military veteran of World War I
 Frank Cali (1965–2019), American crime boss
 Frank Caprio (born 1936), American jurist
 Frank T. Caprio (born 1966), American politician
 Frank Cooper (politician) (1872–1949), Australian politician
 Frank Cooper III, business executive, branded entertainment leader
 Frank de Silva (born 1935), Inspector-General of Sri Lanka Police from 1993-1995
 Frank Dobson (1940–2019), British politician
 Frank DeSimone (1909–1967), Italian American mobster
 Frank Di Mauro (Born 1973) Co-founder of Bookitbee
 Frank Marcus Fernando (1931–2009), 3rd Bishop of the Roman Catholic Diocese of Chilaw
 Frank Grevil (born 1960), Danish whistleblower
 Frank Hastings Griffin (1886-1975), American chemist who invented Rayon
 Frank Heart (1929–2018), American computer engineer and Internet pioneer
 Frank Avery Hutchins (1851-1914), American educator and librarian
 Frank Ebenezer Hill (1880–1932), American Medal of Honor recipient
 Frank K. Houston (1881-1973), president and chairman of the Chemical Corn Exchange Bank in the 1940s.
 Frank James (1843–1915), 19th-century outlaw and member of the James-Younger Gang
 Frank Jenner (1903–1977), English Australian evangelist
 Frank Larkin, disability rights activist
 Frank Charles Laubach (1884–1970), Congregational Christian missionary and mystic
 Frank Laukien, American billionaire businessman
 Frank J. Low (1933–2009), American physicist
 Frank Lowy (born 1930), Australian businessman
 Frank Marshall (chess player) (1877–1944), American chess master
 Frank J. Marshall (engineer), investment banker and former engineer V.P. of Cisco
 Frank Marshall, Baron Marshall of Leeds (1915–1990), British lawyer and politician
 Frank Marshall (priest), Dean of Barbados
 Frank Mockler (1909–1993), 47th Governor of American Samoa
 Frank Pearson (1937–2003), British drag queen known as Foo Foo Lammar
 Frank Schilling (born 1970), domain name and Internet investor
 Frank Smith (psycholinguist), British psycholinguist
 Frank van Kappen (born 1941), Dutch soldier and politician
 Frank Vitkovic, murderer in the Queen Street massacre in Melbourne in 1987
 Frank Wassenberg (born 1966), Dutch politician
 Frank E. Wheelock (1863–1932), a founder and first mayor of Lubbock, Texas
 Frank T. M. White (1909–1971), Australian mining and metallurgical engineer and mineral science educator.

See also 

 Franc (disambiguation)
 Frances (disambiguation)
 Francis (disambiguation)
 Franck (disambiguation)
 Frankie (disambiguation)
 Franks (disambiguation)
 Franklin (given name)
 Francisco (disambiguation)
 Poncho (disambiguation)

References 

Dutch masculine given names
English masculine given names
German masculine given names
French masculine given names

cs:Frank
es:Frank
fr:Frank
ko:프랑크
ja:フランク
pl:Franciszek
ru:Фрэнк
simple:Frank
sk:Frank
sl:Frank (razločitev)